The Battle of Sabiñánigo took place during the Spanish Civil War near Alto Gállego and the town of Sabiñánigo in 1937 as part of the Aragon front.

As part of the Republican strategy, the 43rd and 27th divisions moved to the north, amounting to about 14,000 men and 16 pieces of artillery under the command of Mariano Bueno.  They eventually faced about 10,000 Nationalist troops, based around the 1st Brigade of the 50th National Division. The attack started on 22 September and fighting continued until 8 November, with perhaps about 2,500 Republican casualties and 3,500 Nationalist casualties.

The Republican forces managed to take Biescas, but failed to take Sabiñánigo despite encircling it, or gain complete control of the territory before both sides were exhausted.

References

Battles of the Spanish Civil War
1937 in Spain
Battles in Aragon
Conflicts in 1937